Ernesto Ambrosini (29 September 1894 – 4 November 1951) was an Italian athlete who competed mainly in the 3000 metres steeplechase. He competed for Italy in the 1920 Summer Olympics held in Antwerp, Belgium in the 3000 metre steeple chase where he won the bronze medal.

World record
3000 metres steeplechase: 9.36.6 (Paris, France 9 June 1923)

National titles
Ernesto Ambrosini has won 10 times the individual national championship.
1 win in 800 metres (1920)
2 wins in 1500 metres (1920, 1921)
2 wins in 5000 metres (1922, 1923)
3 wins in 1200 metres steeplechase (1920, 1921, 1922)
1 win in 3000 metres steeplechase (1923)
1 win in Cross country running (1922)

See also
 FIDAL Hall of Fame

References

External links
 
 

1894 births
1951 deaths
Sportspeople from Monza
Italian male cross country runners
Italian male middle-distance runners
Italian male long-distance runners
Italian male steeplechase runners
Olympic bronze medalists for Italy
Athletes (track and field) at the 1920 Summer Olympics
Athletes (track and field) at the 1924 Summer Olympics
Olympic athletes of Italy
Medalists at the 1920 Summer Olympics
Olympic bronze medalists in athletics (track and field)
People from Brianza